This is a list of artists who have recorded for Geffen Records, later under Interscope Records.



0–9
 10,000 Maniacs
 3
 The 7A3

A
 A3
 Adam Bomb
 Aerosmith
 Agnes
 Alberta Cross (Black Lodge/Fiction/Polydor/Geffen)
 Alien Ant Farm
 AlunaGeorge
 Angels & Airwaves (Suretone/Geffen)
 Aqua
 Asia
 Australian Crawl
 Ava Denera (American King Music/Geffen)
 Avant

B

 Alex Band
 Jimmy Barnes
 Beck (DGC/Geffen)
 Lauren Bennett
 Berlin
 Bivouac (DGC/Geffen)
 Black Heff (American King Music/Geffen)
 Black 'N Blue
 Blaque
 Mary J. Blige
 Blink-182
 Bloodhound Gang
 Bone Thugs-n-Harmony
 Børns
 Boss Hog (DGC/Geffen)
 Buckcherry
 Toni Braxton
 Brick & Lace
 Edie Brickell & New Bohemians
 Busta Rhymes

C
 The Candyskins
 Calvin Jeremy (Geffen/Universal Malaysia)
 Irene Cara
 Belinda Carlisle
 Carly Rae Jepsen (Geffen Malaysia)
 Eric Carmen
 Peter Case
 Catfish
 Greyson Chance (Geffen/Maverick/eleveneleven)
 Cher
 The Chameleons
 Charlotte Sometimes
 Chauncey Black (Flipmode/Aftermath/Geffen)
 Chevy Woods (Taylor Gang/Geffen)
 Bryn Christopher
Cinder
 Class The King (American King Music/Geffen)
 Clubland
 Coconut Records
 Keyshia Cole
 Pat Metheny/Ornette Coleman
 Cold
 Lloyd Cole and the Commotions
 Judy Collins
 Common (G.O.O.D. Music/Geffen)
 Bill Cosby
 Counting Crows (DGC/Geffen)
 Cowboy Junkies
 Nadine Coyle
 The Creatures
 The Crystal Method
 The Cure

D
 Days of the New (Outposext/Geffen)
 Death Angel
 Alon De Loco
 Depswa
 Jason Derulo (American King Music/Geffen)
 Deuce
 Diamond Head
 DJ Shadow
 DJ Snake
 Christine Dolce
 Geoffrey Downes
 Driveblind
 Drop Dead, Gorgeous (Suretone/Geffen)

E
 Eagles
 Eastern Conference Champions
 Elastica (DGC/Geffen)
 Eleanor McEvoy
 Enya (US)
 Esquire
 Everything Everything
 Ezo

F
 Fan 3
 Field Mob (Disturbing tha Peace/Geffen)
 Finch
 Floetry
 Steve Forbert
 Nelly Furtado (Mosley Music/Geffen)
 FOS (Fortress of Solitude)

G
 Peter Gabriel (US and Canada)
 Galactic Cowboys
 Game (BWS/Geffen)
 Garbage (Almo Sounds/Geffen)
 Gene Loves Jezebel (US)
 Girlicious
 God Street Wine
 Whoopi Goldberg
 Selena Gomez (Geffen/Hollywood Malaysia)
 Macy Gray (will.i.am Music Group/Geffen)
 Grim Reaper
 Gryffin
 Guns N' Roses
 Genius/GZA
 Adrian Gurvitz

H
 Sammy Hagar
 Hagar Schon Aaronson Shrieve
 Half Way Home
 Kimberly Hall (American King Music/Geffen)
 James Hall (DGC/Geffen)
 Trevor Hall
 Deborah Harry
 Imogen Heap (Almo Sounds/Geffen)
 Hedley (Universal/Geffen)
 Don Henley
 John Hiatt
 Hoku
 Hole (DGC/Geffen)
 Jennifer Holliday
 Hotboii (Rebel)
 Debra Hurd
 Hush

I
 Maarja-Liis Ilus
 Il Volo
 Ish Ledesma
 It Bites (US)
 iayze

J
 J.I (G*Starr Ent./Geffen/Interscope)
 Jackyl
 Jade Ewen
 Jibbs
 Joanna
 Daron Jones
 Elton John (US and Canada)
 Malese Jow
 Jimmy Page
 Junkyard

K
 Kamaiyah
 Kardinal Offishall
 Ken Laszlo
 Tommy Keene
 Kelis
 Tori Kelly
 Killah Priest
 B.B. King
 Kitarō
 Solange Knowles (Music World Entertainment/Geffen)
 Fela Kuti

L
 Large Professor
 Lawson (Geffen Malaysia)
 Lee Ryan
 John Lennon
 Lifehouse
 The Like
 Limp Bizkit
 Little Caesar (DGC/Geffen)
 Lisa Loeb
 Lone Justice
Lo-Pro
 Inger Lorre
 Loud Lucy (DGC/Geffen)

M
 Machine Gun Kelly
 Madness (US)
 Aimee Mann (DGC/Geffen)
 Lyle Mays
 Mac McAnally
 Maria McKee
 Manowar
 Pat Metheny Group
 Mini Viva
 Mims (American King Music/Geffen)
 Kylie Minogue (North America)
 Joni Mitchell
 Missez
 The Misfits
 Mixi
 Models
 Mommyheads
 Thurston Moore (DGC/Geffen)
 Mos Def
 Mummy Calls
 Walter Murphy and His Orchestra
 My Little Funhouse
 Gary Myrick

N
 Leona Naess
 Kate Nash (US)
 Nelson (DGC/Geffen)
 New Edition
 New Found Glory
 New Jeans (Hybe-ADOR/Geffen)
 New Radicals
 Olivia Newton-John (US/Canada)
 Nirvana (DGC/Geffen)
 Nitzer Ebb (US)
 NLT
 Noa
 Non Phixion
 Nonpoint
 Terri Nunn
 The Nymphs

O
 Ric Ocasek
 Yoko Ono
 Orianthi
 Emily Osment
 Ours
 Oxo
 Olivia Rodrigo

P
 Nerina Pallot
 Papa Roach
 Pariah
 Ray Parker Jr.
 Janel Parrish
 Pell Mell (DGC/Geffen)
 Phantom Blue
 Phantom Planet
 The Pink Spiders (Suretone/Geffen)
 Pitchshifter
 Planet P Project
 The Plimsouls
 Poppy (Island/Geffen)
 The Posies (DGC/Geffen)
 Prima J
 Prince Ty (American King Music/Geffen)
 Project Pat (Taylor Gang/Geffen)
 Puddle of Mudd (Flawless/Geffen)

Q
 Quarterflash

R
 The Raincoats (DGC/Geffen)
 Raw Stylus
 Remy Zero
 Ringside
 Rise Against 
 Joan Rivers
 Tom Robinson
 Rock City Angels
 Olivia Rodrigo
 Rooney (Cherrytree/Geffen)
 Emmy Rossum
 Mike Ruekberg
 Lee Ryan

S
 Saigon Kick (Uzi Suicide/Geffen)
 St. Johnny (DGC/Geffen)
 STAYC (HighUp Entertainment/Geffen/Interscope)
 Saliva
 Salty Dog (Geffen)
 Jessica Sanchez (Polydor/Geffen UK)
 The Saturdays
 Scorcher
 Semi Precious Weapons (Cherry Tree/Razor & Tie)
 Shawnna (Nappy Boy/Geffen)
 She Wants Revenge
 Shooting Star
 Shwayze (Suretone/Geffen)
 Sigur Rós (US)
 Simon and Garfunkel (Outside of USA & Canada)
 Ashlee Simpson
 Siouxsie and the Banshees (US/Canada)
 Slash
 Slumber Party Girls
 Snoop Dogg
 Snot
 Snow Patrol (US)
 Something Corporate
 Sonic Youth (DGC/Geffen)
 Sound the Alarm
 Southern Culture on the Skids (DGC/Geffen)
 Spensha Baker
 Spotem Gottem (Rebel)
 The Starting Line
 The Stone Roses (US)
 The Style Council (US)
 Sublime (Gasoline Alley/Geffen)
 The Sugarplastic (DGC/Geffen)
 Donna Summer
 The Sundays (DGC/Geffen)
 Sweet 75 (DGC/Geffen)
 S.T.U.N.
 The Sylvers

T
 Teenage Fanclub (DGC/Geffen)
 Tesla
 that dog. (DGC/Geffen)
 The Sound of Arrows
 Ashley Tisdale
 Tokyo's Revenge
 Trust Company
 The Band (American/Republic/The Body Of Woman/Geffen)
 Twenty Twenty
 Tyketto

U
 Kali Uchis

V
 Vagabond
 Vanity
 Van Zant (eponymous album, 1985)
 Veruca Salt (DGC/Geffen)
 Vitamin Z
 Il Volo

W
 Rufus Wainwright
 Wang Chung
 The Wanted
 Warrant
 Warrior Soul
 Was (Not Was)
 The Waterboys
 We've Got a Fuzzbox and We're Gonna Use It
 Weezer (DGC/Geffen)
 Gillian Welch (Almo Sounds/Geffen)
 John Wetton
 Whiskeytown
 Matt White
 White Lies
 Whitesnake (US & Canada)
 White Zombie
 Wild Colonials (DGC/Geffen)
 Wishbone Ash
 Nicole Wray
 Zakk Wylde

X
 X Ambassadors
 XTC (US)

Y
 YUNGBLUD
 Neil Young
 Y&T
 Yeat

Z
 Van Zant
 Remy Zero (DGC/Geffen)
 Rob Zombie

See also
Geffen Records

References

 
Geffen Records